Mechamato is a Malaysian animated series produced by Animonsta Studios, focusing on a boy named Amato and his partner robot MechaBot, who fight against bad robots. Mechamato is a part of the BoBoiBoy franchise and the series also takes place before the BoBoiBoy and BoBoiBoy Galaxy.

The animated series, Mechamato: The Animated Series premiered on Cartoon Network Asia from 4 December 2021 to 26 February 2022 for the first season. The first season was also released on Netflix for the Asia-Pacific region in October 2022. The second season premiered on 5 December 2022.

The film version, Mechamato Movie, which is the prequel of the animated series, has been released in Malaysia and Brunei on 8 December 2022.

Premise

Setting
Mechamato is set in Kota Hilir, inspired by Bandar Hilir in Malacca City in the real world, which is also the creator's hometown. It features the uniqueness of Malaysian culture such as silat, the Peranakan culture and local food, but is embroidered with futuristic elements such as robots and spaceships.

Plot
A boy named Amato finds a prison spaceship containing bad robots that have crashed on Earth. One such robot is the MechaBot which has the ability to mechanize everyday objects into high-tech devices. Amato manages to outsmart MechaBot and eventually becomes the master of MechaBot. Since then, MechaBot and Amato have started working together to find and capture the bad robots.

Characters
Amato / Mechamato
Voiced by: Alexander Machado (English); Armand Ezra (Malay)
A kind, creative and imaginative boy who becomes the master of MechaBot after he manages to outsmart MechaBot. 
MechaBot
Voiced by: Alex Teixeira (English); Adzlan Nazir (Malay)
A Power Sphera which is the most powerful destructive robot in the galaxy. It has the power to combine any item with its Mechanize power. However, it has to obey Amato's instructions because Amato has become his new master.
Pian
Voiced by: Katherine Clare Clavelo (English); Ielham Iskandar (Malay)
Amato's good friend who is very rich and a clever creator. He is the only one who understands Amato's bad paintings.
   Mara
Voiced by: Katherine Clare Clavelo (English); Marissa Balqis (Malay)
A female friend of Amato who is a wheelchair user. She is a person with an artistic soul, and also independent, brave and does not give up. She always helps Amato and his friends in solving problems.
Deep
Voiced by: Daniel Cortes (English); Syabil Syamin (Malay)
Amato's friend who is always happy-go-lucky. He loves to play games and has high creativity, which is higher than Amato himself.

Production
Mechamato is created by Animonsta Studios which is known for BoBoiBoy series. The series itself is an indirect prequel for BoBoiBoy when the main character, Amato is revealed as the father of BoBoiBoy, which is under the Power Sphera Universe. The idea for this series came in 2018 when Animonsta Studios pitch the idea to Cartoon Network. The studio wanted a robot-buddy story that represented a child-like imagination that could be associated with each child, such as making a robot costume out of a cardboard box. The creator Nizam Razak wanted Mechamato to inspire children to imagine possibilities, to use technology responsibly. He revealed that this idea came while moving house, where his children were playing with boxes and imagined being in a tank. This reminds him of being in a box as a child, pretending to be driving in a car. The thing sparks the idea to create a 'Power Sphera' that can combine with the boxes and turn into a high-tech car or tank, who then noticed that the idea was not limited to the boxes only. As for the name Amato, it was inspired by two things: Amat, which is a common Malay name, and the use of 'O' at the end of the name of a drink that Malaysians only add sugar without milk, such as Kopi O. He and his creative team initially envisioned Amato and MechaBot as a duo of superheroes riding futuristic motorcycles and fighting super villains bigger than themselves. The concepts were sketched out five years before the series was released and they look simpler than it turns out. Based on the initial concept, their animator partners and friends in Japan, Hong Kong, Singapore and France gave positive feedback.

The grown-up Amato wearing the MechaBot suit, who kept an old photo of him with infant BoBoiBoy and another photo of him sending BoBoiBoy to the train station, was featured in the post-credit scene of BoBoiBoy Movie 2, with the studio giving the hint for this series. The extended version of the first episode of the BoBoiBoy series was also released on Monsta official YouTube channel on 14 March 2021, adding a new scene of Amato sending his son BoBoiBoy to the train station at the beginning of the episode.

The name of the series was revealed as early as 2019 when Animonsta Studios announced the series on a video for their 2020 plans. The first look of the series is revealed on 8 April 2020 when the first teaser is released on Monsta official YouTube channel.

Media

Movie

The movie of the series, named Mechamato Movie, was originally planned to be released in 2020, but postponed to 2021. The official trailer was released on 1 January 2021, intended for the release of 2021. However, due to uncertainty over the COVID-19 pandemic situation and vaccination, the film was postponed several times, from November or December 2020 to March 2021 to May or June 2021 and finally until end 2021. However, plans to release the film earlier than the animated series were cancelled due to the COVID-19 pandemic and the animated series had already been developed according to schedule which is set to be released in December 2021. On 15 September 2022, it has been announced that the movie will be released on 8 December 2022 in Malaysian cinemas. The final trailer and the official poster were revealed on 8 November 2022, a month before the release.

Animated series
The animated series, named Mechamato: The Animated Series was announced to be broadcast on Cartoon Network Asia under WarnerMedia for Adult Swim the Asia-Pacific region. It was premiered on 4 December 2021, with a special sneak-peek episode on 6 November 2021. Although the series was released before Mechamato Movie, the timeline of the series is after the movie. The opening theme, titled "Armored Hero Mechamato!", is composed by Nur Sharmine Md Bakri and performed by Shah from the indie band Modescape for Malay version and Nil Cardoso for the English version, which is recorded in the US. As for Japanese version, the opening theme is performed by Tatsuhiko Yoshida. The series is available in 21 countries with dubbing in English, Malay, Indonesian, Cantonese, Vietnamese, Mandarin, Tagalog and Thai for their respective countries on 4 December 2021. For Korean, it was available starting 11 December 2021 in South Korea, while for Japanese, it will be available starting 27 March 2022 in Japan. The voice actors for the Japanese version was announced by Cartoon Network Japan on 31 January 2021, which features Ayumu Murase and Yoshitsugu Matsuoka.

For outside Asia, Jetpack Distribution has acquired worldwide rights, which includes season one.

On 23 June 2022, it is announced that Mechamato: The Animated Series is currently streaming on HBO GO. For the Malaysian market, the series is also broadcast on Astro Prima, starting 16 July 2022 where it would be aired each Saturday and Sunday at 7 pm. Mechamato also gets a release in Portugal, which is aired in SIC K from 3 September.

On 15 September 2022, alongside the movie date release reveal, it is announced that it will be released on various platforms before the movie release. For streaming platforms, it will be released on Netflix for the Asia-Pacific region on 1 October, YouTube on 7 October and Vidio on 21 October. For the TV release, it will be premiered on TV9 on 3 October, MNCTV on 30 October and TV3 on 4 December. For Netflix release, it is available in 6 languages, namely Malay, English, Thai, Mandarin, Korean and Japanese.

On 11 November 2022, it is confirmed that there would be a second season, in which the creator mentioned that they already had submitted all 13 episodes to Cartoon Network. The second season premiered on 5 December 2022 on Cartoon Network in Malaysia, Indonesia and the Philippines, and on 10 December 2022 in Japan, while for South Korea, Australia, New Zealand, Vietnam, Thailand, Taiwan and Hong Kong, MONSTA is still waiting for the schedule.

Episode list

<onlyinclude>

Season 1 (2021–22)

Season 2 (2022–23)

Video games
Mechamato Robot Battle, an immersive game experience on Roblox, has been announced in October 2022. It is an online gaming space where fans and players can explore the vast open world of Kota Hilir, as seen on Mechamato: The Animated Series.

Reception
The series received positive feedback in general, in particularly for its animation, action and comedy. The series also caught the attention of fans in Japan after it aired on Cartoon Network Japan and Netflix Japan, where positive reactions could be seen on Twitter.

Mechamato has been nominated for the Best TV Anime category at the 2023 Tokyo Anime Awards Festival, in which the highest position ever achieved by this series in that category is 3rd place. Mechamato also peaked at No. 2 for Top 10 TV Show on Netflix Malaysia, and managed to break into Top 10 Kids Show on Netflix for Indonesia, Singapore and South Korea.

References

External links
 
 

2020s animated television series
Malaysian children's animated action television series
Malaysian children's animated adventure television series
Malaysian children's animated comic science fiction television series
Malaysian children's animated superhero television series
Animonsta Studios
Child superheroes
Animated television series about children